Todd A. Brun is an American engineer and physicist, currently a professor at University of Southern California. He is a Fellow of the American Physical Society for "contributions to quantum theory and quantum information science, including decoherence and continuous quantum measurement, quantum computation, and quantum error correction." He is a coinventor of the method of entanglement-assisted quantum error correction, which allows for the use of shared entanglement in quantum error correction and for producing a quantum error correction code from an arbitrary classical error correction code.

References

Year of birth missing (living people)
Living people
Fellows of the American Physical Society
American electrical engineers
University of Southern California faculty